Call + Response is a documentary film released in 2008 by Fair Trade Pictures to support human rights activism against human trafficking and slavery on a community level. The film was Justin Dillon's directorial debut. This is the final film that Don LaFontaine voiced the trailers for the movie a month after his death.

Details
The film explores the 21st century slave trade industry and offers firsthand accounts on the issue from Cornel West, Madeleine Albright, Daryl Hannah, Julia Ormond, Ashley Judd, Nicholas D. Kristof, and many other prominent political and cultural figures. The film also includes musical performances from Moby, Natasha Bedingfield, Cold War Kids, Matisyahu, Imogen Heap, Emmanuel Jal, Talib Kweli, The Scrolls, Five For Fighting, Switchfoot, Rocco Deluca, and Justin Dillon.

Call + Response led to the formation of Fair Trade Fund, Inc., d.b.a. Made In A Free World, a non-profit organization dedicated to ending modern-day slavery. All profits from Call + Response, such as from sales of the DVD, soundtrack, and iTunes downloads, are used to support Made In A Free World's projects, aimed at disrupting the business of slavery, particularly child slavery and forced labor.

References

External links
 
 

2008 films
Documentary films about prostitution
American documentary films
Documentary films about slavery
2008 documentary films
Films about human trafficking
2000s English-language films
2000s American films